The Missouri Pacific Depot is a historic railroad station at Market and Ramey Streets in Bald Knob, Arkansas.  It is a rectangular single-story structure, framed in wood and finished in brick, with a broad shallow-pitch hip roof.  The northern side of the roof, where passengers waited, is supported by brick posts and has large L-shaped brackets.  Built in 1915, it is Bald Knob's second railroad station, a reminder of the role the railroad played in the city's development.

The building was listed on the National Register of Historic Places in 1992.

See also
Missouri Pacific Railway Caboose No. 928
National Register of Historic Places listings in White County, Arkansas

References

Railway stations on the National Register of Historic Places in Arkansas
Railway stations in the United States opened in 1915
Buildings and structures in Bald Knob, Arkansas
National Register of Historic Places in White County, Arkansas
Former Missouri Pacific Railroad stations
Former railway stations in Arkansas
1915 establishments in Arkansas
Transportation in White County, Arkansas
Mediterranean Revival architecture in Arkansas